Percy Arthur Gordon Champion (March 1887 – 1957) was an English professional footballer who played as an outside left in the Football League for Fulham.

Personal life 

Champion served in the East Lancashire Regiment prior to the First World War and in the middle of the war in July 1916, he re-enlisted in the Royal Army Service Corps. He saw action in Salonika and was promoted to sergeant in August 1917. At the time malaria and gastritis led to Champion's discharge from the army in November 1919, he was holding the rank of company sergeant major.

Career statistics

References

1887 births
People from Lewes
English footballers
Association football outside forwards
Woking F.C. players
Fulham F.C. players
English Football League players
British Army personnel of World War I
East Lancashire Regiment soldiers
1957 deaths
Royal Army Service Corps soldiers